Martin Hall (born 5 December 1968) was the head coach of Halifax from June 2006 until May 2010. He took over the head coach job from sacked coach Anthony Farrell. Hall previously played  at Oldham (Heritage No. 915), Rochdale Hornets, Wigan (Heritage No. 878), Castleford (Heritage No. 753), Halifax and Hull FC. Martin Hall played , and scored a try in Wigan's 30–10 victory over Leeds in the 1995 Challenge Cup Final during the 1994–95 season at Wembley Stadium, London on Saturday 29 April 1995, in front of a crowd of 78,550. After the 1993–94 Rugby Football League season Hall travelled with defending champions Wigan to Brisbane, playing from the interchange bench in their 1994 World Club Challenge victory over Australian premiers, the Brisbane Broncos. He was also the head coach of the Wales national rugby league team for 3 years between 2005 and 2007 and has had coaching stints at Rochdale Hornets and Hull Kingston Rovers.

Playing career

County Cup Final appearances
Martin Hall played in Rochdale Hornets 14–24 defeat by St. Helens in the 1991 Lancashire Cup Final during the 1991–92 season at Wilderspool Stadium, Warrington, on Sunday 20 October 1991.

Regal Trophy Final appearances
Martin Hall played  in Wigan's 40–10 victory over Warrington in the 1994–95 Regal Trophy Final during the 1994–95 season at Alfred McAlpine Stadium, Huddersfield on Saturday 28 January 1995, and played  in the 25–17 victory over St. Helens in the 1995–96 Regal Trophy Final during the 1994–95 season at Alfred McAlpine Stadium, Huddersfield on Saturday 13 January 1996.

References

External links
Wigan profile

1968 births
Living people
Castleford Tigers players
English people of Welsh descent
English rugby league coaches
English rugby league players
Halifax R.L.F.C. coaches
Halifax R.L.F.C. players
Hull F.C. players
Hull Kingston Rovers coaches
Oldham R.L.F.C. players
Rochdale Hornets coaches
Rochdale Hornets players
Rugby league hookers
Rugby league players from Oldham
Wales national rugby league team coaches
Wales national rugby league team players
Wigan Warriors players